Carsten Keller (born 8 September 1939) is a former field hockey player from West-Germany, who won a gold medal for his native country at the 1972 Summer Olympics in Munich. He played 133 international matches for Germany, and retired after the Munich Games. Keller then became a hockey coach.

Three of his children also played hockey at the highest level, and all were strikers. Andreas became Olympic champion in 1992 (Barcelona), after securing silver at the two previous Olympics in Los Angeles (1984) and Seoul (1988). Natascha competed in four Olympics, and also won a gold medal at the 2004 Summer Olympics in Athens. Florian won a gold medal at the 2008 Summer Olympics in Beijing.

Carsten Keller's father Erwin grabbed a silver medal in the same sport at the 1936 Summer Olympics in Berlin.

References

External links
 

1939 births
Living people
German male field hockey players
Olympic field hockey players of West Germany
Field hockey players at the 1972 Summer Olympics
German field hockey coaches
Olympic gold medalists for West Germany
Olympic medalists in field hockey
Medalists at the 1972 Summer Olympics
Field hockey players at the 1968 Summer Olympics
Field hockey players at the 1960 Summer Olympics
Olympic field hockey players of the United Team of Germany
20th-century German people